Global Federation of Animal Sanctuaries is a non-profit group which provides certification for animal sanctuaries, rescue centers, and rehabilitation centers through verification and accreditation.  The group was founded in 2007 and is located in Washington D.C.

References

External links 

Animal welfare
Animal sanctuaries